Sergeant is a surname. Notable people with the surname include:

Adeline Sergeant (1851–1904), English writer
Edward Guthlac Sergeant (1881–1961), English chess master
Elizabeth Shepley Sergeant (1881–1965), American journalist and writer
George Sergeant (1881–1971), American attorney and mayor of Dallas, Texas
Howard Sergeant (1914–1987), British poet and editor
Jack Sergeant (born 1995), Gibraltarian footballer
John Sergeant (priest) (1623–1707 or 1710), English Roman Catholic priest, controversialist and theologian
John Sergeant (missionary) (1710–1749), American missionary to the Mahicans of Stockbridge
John Sergeant (politician) (1779–1852), American politician and member of the US House of Representatives from Pennsylvania
John Sergeant (journalist) (born 1944), British journalist and broadcaster
Jonathan Dickinson Sergeant (1746–1793), lawyer, representative for New Jersey in the Second Continental Congress in 1776 and 1777 and Attorney General of Pennsylvania
Lewis Sergeant (1841–1902), English journalist and author
Malcolm Sargent (1895–1967), British orchestra conductor
Marc Sergeant (born 1959), Belgian former professional road bicycle racer and team manager
Peta Sergeant (born 1980), Australian actress
Peter Sergeant (died 1714), English-born merchant in Boston, Massachusetts
Philip Walsingham Sergeant (1872–1952), British chess and history writer
Richard Sergeant (died 1586), beatified English Roman Catholic priest and martyr
Sharon Sergeant (born 1947), American forensic genealogist
Thomas Sergeant (1782–1860), American lawyer, judge, and politician
Tony Sergeant (born 1977), Belgian football midfielder
Will Sergeant (born 1958), English guitarist best known as a member of Echo & the Bunnymen

See also
Sargeant (surname)
Sargent (name)
Harry Sergeaunt (1891–1959), English footballer
Edmond Sergent (1876–1969), French parasitologist
Robert Bertram Serjeant (1915–1993), a British Arabist
Sergius

English-language surnames
Occupational surnames
English-language occupational surnames